Colin Stewart (February 21, 1927 – March 6, 2015) was an American alpine skier. He competed in the men's slalom at the 1948 Winter Olympics. He graduated from Dartmouth College and Harvard Graduate School of Design.

References

1927 births
2015 deaths
American male alpine skiers
Olympic alpine skiers of the United States
Alpine skiers at the 1948 Winter Olympics
People from Hanover, New Hampshire
Dartmouth College alumni
Harvard Graduate School of Design alumni